Vittorio Torre  died 16 January 1921 in Turin (Italy) was an Italian chess player.

He became unofficial Chess Champion of Italy in Turin (VI Torneo Nazionale) in 1895, beating Beniamino Vergani.

References

Italian chess players
1921 deaths
Year of birth missing